Alan Richard Burton (born 11 January 1939) is an English former professional footballer who played as a left winger in the Football League.

References

Sources

1939 births
Living people
Sportspeople from Aldershot
English footballers
Association football wingers
Wimbledon F.C. players
Aldershot F.C. players
English Football League players
Alton F.C. players
Footballers from Hampshire